Wallman or Wallmann is a surname, in the English language originally an occupational surname derived from the occupation of "wallman" in salt pan works.

Notable persons with the name include:

Arvid Wallman, gold medalist in plain high diving at the 1920 Olympics, representing Sweden
Hans E. Wallman, Swedish entrepreneur, impresario, composer, film director, author, and theatrical producer
Henry Wallman, American mathematician
Katherine Wallman, former Chief Statistician of the United States
Margarete Wallmann, German-Austrian ballerina, choreographer, stage designer, and opera director
Norm Wallman, Nebraska state senator from 2007–2015
Steven Wallman, a commissioner of the U.S. Securities and Exchange Commission from 1994-1997

See also
Walman/Walmann
Valman (disambiguation)

English-language surnames
Occupational surnames